Introspectivo is a studio album by American composer/arranger/pianist Clare Fischer, recorded in December 2004 and released in October 2005 on the Mexican label, M&L Music. Composed largely of previously unrecorded original compositions unearthed by his son Brent, this would be the 76-year-old Fischer's fifth and final strictly solo piano recording.

Track listing
All compositions by Clare Fischer except where indicated.
 "Song for Eugenio" – 6:15
 "Quiet Reflections" – 2:50
 "Western Airlines" – 2:53
 "Love's Walk" – 5:41
 "Sleep Sweet Child" – 1:18
 Ellington Medley ("Sentimental Lady" – Duke Ellington, "Daydream" – Billy Strayhorn, "Satin Doll" – Johnny Mercer, B. Strayhorn, D. Ellington) – 6:40 
 "Elegy" – 3:03
 "A Wish Come True" – 1:03
 "Warmeland" (Swedish traditional) – 4:42
 "Marcella" – 2:00
 "Bells" – 3:30
 "Silenciosa" (Mario Ruiz Armengol) – 1:44
 "House on Summit/Children at Play" – 3:45
 "Vanessa" – 1:50
 "Eternally Yours" – 3:52
 "Soñe" (Mario Ruiz Armengol) – 1:38
 "Barboleta" – 3:30
 "Waiting for Jack's Plane" – 1:31
 "All the Things You Are" (Jerome Kern, Oscar Hammerstein) – 3:35
 "Donna Lee" (Charlie Parker, Phil Woods [sic]) – 0:38
 "Ice Crystals" – 3:17
 "Don't Ever Leave" – 1:40
 "Coming Home" – 1:52
 "Fairyland" (Glen Hurlbut, Bob Thompson and Bill Baldwin) – 4:57

Personnel
Clare Fischer - piano

References

2005 albums
Clare Fischer albums
Instrumental albums